The discography of American hip hop duo Macklemore & Ryan Lewis consists of two studio albums, two extended plays, 17 singles and 15 music videos. Macklemore and Lewis' single "Thrift Shop" reached number one on the US Billboard Hot 100 in 2013. The single was soon dubbed the first song since 1994 to top the Hot 100 chart without the support of a major record label by Billboard, although Macklemore, in a slightly unusual recording contract, pays a nominal percentage of sales for the usage of Warner Bros. Records' radio promotion department to push the releases of their singles.

Their second single, "Can't Hold Us", also peaked at number one on the Hot 100, making Macklemore and Lewis the first duo in the chart's history to have their first two singles both reach the peak position. Macklemore and Lewis released their debut studio album The Heist on October 9, 2012, which charted at number two on the US Billboard 200. The pair was nominated for seven Grammy awards at the 56th Annual Grammy Awards, winning four awards, including Best New Artist, Best Rap Album (The Heist), Best Rap Song and Best Rap Performance ("Thrift Shop"). As of April 2019, the music video for "Thrift Shop" has amassed over 1.3 billion views on YouTube. Macklemore & Ryan Lewis released their second studio album This Unruly Mess I've Made on February 26, 2016, charting at number four on the Billboard 200. The album was supported by its lead single "Downtown", which peaked at number twelve on Billboard Hot 100.

Studio albums

Extended plays

Singles

As lead artist

As featured artist

Promotional singles

Other charted songs

Music videos

As lead artist

As featured artist

Notes

References

External links
 Official website

Discographies of American artists
Hip hop discographies